is the second animated film adaptation of the anime and manga series Bleach. The film is directed by Noriyuki Abe, and co-written by Michiko Yokote and Masahiro Ōkubo, and the theatrical release was on December 22, 2007. The DVD of the film was released on September 6, 2008.

To promote the film, the opening and closing credits of the Bleach anime from episode 151-154 use footage from the film. Kubo also published a special manga chapter focusing on Hitsugaya's past to further promote the film. The English release of the DVD was on September 8, 2009, and it was aired on Adult Swim on December 5, 2009. The official European release of the film was on September 6, 2010 and in the United Kingdom on Blu-ray on May 7, 2012.

Plot
Soul Reapers of the 10th Division—led by its captain Tōshirō Hitsugaya and vice-captain Rangiku Matsumoto—are sent to escort the "King's Seal". The rare artifact is stolen during transport by the deviated Soul Reaper Sōjirō Kusaka and two girls known as Ying and Yang. Hitsugaya seems to recognize the Soul Reaper, who wounds him and leaves, and abandons his post to pursue the man while leaving his squad behind to fend for themselves. Later, Soul Society suspects Hitsugaya of treason, orders his immediate capture, and puts his whole squad under house arrest.

In the human world, Soul Reaper Ichigo Kurosaki is informed about the events happening in the Soul Society, and finds Hitsugaya, who passes out. Hitsugaya wakes up in Ichigo's house, and they are attacked by Ying and Yang. Ichigo fights, while Hitsugaya escapes and continues to avoid an attempt of capture by Soul Society. The suspect on him increases when Kusaka attacks a Soul Society's captain using Hyōrinmaru, a zanpakutō—special swords used by Soul Reapers—with identical powers to Hitsugaya's. Hitsugaya's capture is then made top priority and his execution is approved.

Through his wandering to avoid capture, Hitsugaya eventually manages to track Kusaka down, and it is revealed that the two managed to manifest the same zanpakutō. Because Soul Society does not allow the same zanpakutō to be wielded by different people, the two were forced to fight to the death. Hitsugaya did not wish to fight, but had no other option as Kusaka attacked, claiming that he was the only one worthy of Hyōrinmaru. The authorities concluded that Hitsugaya was the true owner of Hyōrinmaru and carried out Kusaka's execution. Kusaka died and was reborn as a Hollow in their world, Hueco Mundo. Once he learned of the King's Seal and its powers—which allows the user to freely manipulate time, space and matter—he started his plan of revenge against Soul Society.

Using the King's Seal, Kusaka teleports Hitsugaya and himself to Soul Society, needing Hitsugaya's power to break the seal. The Soul Reapers find and attack Hitsugaya and Kusaka, but are thrown back when Ichigo intervene. As Hitsugaya refuses, Kusaka breaks the seal himself, after which he transforms into a giant dragon-like creature made of ice. However, because he lacks the control which Hitsugaya possesses, the power goes berserk and threatens to destroy Soul Society. A hoard of Hollows appears out of Kusaka's castle, which he had generated out of the Kings' Seal. While several Soul Reapers face the Hollows, Ichigo and Hitsugaya storm up to the central tower. After they destroy Kusaka's dragon-like form, Hitsugaya impales Kusaka. Hitsugaya is cleared of all charges and the King's Seal is restored. After the credits, he and Rangiku visit Kusaka's grave.

Production
Tite Kubo, author from the Bleach manga, authored a one-shot based on Tōshirō, prior to the film's premier in order to promote it. He was also allowed to participate in the making of the film, to design the character of Kusaka. However, Kubo could not add Kusaka to his one-shot due to the fact the original concept came from the manga. In order to promote the second film of Bleach, the trailer had the line "Execute Hitsugaya!". Kubo admitted that it was his own idea to make everybody be surprised, but he and Masakazu Morita, the voice actor of Ichigo Kurosaki, received a lot of letters from worried fans, causing Kubo to apologize in response.

Cast

Reception

The film opened in 4th place at the Japanese box office, and held a top ten location until its 5th week.

The DVD release of the film was the first best selling anime DVD released that week, and is now released in many different languages.

Other media
Light novel adaptation of movie was released on December 22, 2007.

Sōjirō Kusaka in the PSP video game Bleach: Heat the Soul 5, Bleach: Heat the Soul 6 and Bleach: Heat the Soul 7 as a playable character.

Notes

References

External links
  
 
 

2007 anime films
Anime films composed by Shirō Sagisu
DiamondDust Rebellion, The
Films directed by Noriyuki Abe
2000s Japanese-language films
Toho animated films
Viz Media anime